Joel Alexander Findlay (born 29 June 1989) is an Australian male badminton player. In 2014, he won the men's doubles title at the Australian National Badminton Championships teamed up with fellow Victorian Luke Chong. He and Chong also won bronze medal at the 2014 Oceania Badminton Championships. In 2017, he won the silver medal at the Oceania Championships in the mixed doubles event partnered with Gronya Somerville.

Achievements

Oceania Championships
Men's Doubles

Mixed Doubles

BWF International Challenge/Series
Men's Doubles

 BWF International Challenge tournament
 BWF International Series tournament
 BWF Future Series tournament

References

External links 
 
 

Australian male badminton players
1989 births
Living people
Sportspeople from Ballarat